Ochaun Mathis (born January 9, 1999) is an American football defensive end who currently plays for the Nebraska Cornhuskers. He previously played for the TCU Horned Frogs.

Early life and high school career
Mathis grew up in Manor, Texas and attended Manor High School. He was rated a three-star recruit and committed to play college football at Texas Christian University (TCU) over offers from Oklahoma, Texas, and Texas Tech.

College career

TCU 
Mathis began his college career playing for the TCU Horned Frogs. He played in four games as a true freshman before redshirting the season. He had 40 tackles with nine tackles for loss and 2.5 sacks in his redshirt freshman season. Mathis was named second team All-Big 12 Conference after making 46 tackles with 14 tackles for loss and a team-high nine sacks in 2020. He repeated as a second team All-Big 12 selection in 2021 after recording 45 tackles with seven tackles for loss and four sacks. Following the end of the season Mathis entered the NCAA transfer portal.

Nebraska 
Mathis ultimately transferred to Nebraska.

References

External links
 TCU Horned Frogs bio
 Nebraska Cornhuskers bio

Living people
American football defensive ends
Players of American football from Texas
Nebraska Cornhuskers football players
TCU Horned Frogs football players
Year of birth missing (living people)